Pencil cedar may refer to any of several species of tree in the families Araliaceae and Cupressaceae:

 African pencil cedar - Juniperus procera CUPRESSACEAE
 Bermudan pencil cedar - Juniperus bermudiana CUPRESSACEAE
 Black pencil cedar - Polyscias elegans ARALIACEAE
 Pencil cedar - Polyscias murrayi ARALIACEAE
 Pencil cedar, Virginia pencil cedar - Juniperus virginiana CUPRESSACEAE